Trudy Camilleri (born 16 September 1991) is an Australian football (soccer) player who last played for Sydney FC in the Australian W-League. She previously played for the now-defunct Central Coast Mariners and for Western Sydney Wanderers.

Trudy made her W-League debut for Central Coast Mariners against Melbourne Victory on Saturday, 25 October 2008. Trudy then made her scoring debut in Round 2 against Perth Glory, scoring a goal to assist the Mariners to a 3–1 win at home.

In October 2012 it was announced that Camilleri had signed for Western Sydney Wanderers in the Westfield W-League in Australia for the 2012–13 season. She made her Wanderers debut against Adelaide on 20 October 2012.

Personal life
Following her retirement from football, Camilleri now teaches automotive repair with TAFE NSW.

Photos

References

External links
 Central Coast Mariners FC profile 

1991 births
Living people
Australian women's soccer players
Central Coast Mariners FC (A-League Women) players
Western Sydney Wanderers FC (A-League Women) players
Sydney FC (A-League Women) players
Women's association football midfielders